The Hochfinsler (2,423 m) is a mountain of the Glarus Alps, located south of Flums in the canton of St. Gallen. It lies on the range north of the Wissgandstöckli, that separates the Schilstal from the Weisstannental.

References

External links
Hochfinsler on Hikr

Mountains of the Alps
Mountains of Switzerland
Mountains of the canton of St. Gallen